Cockahoop is Cerys Matthews' first solo album, released in 2003. It peaked at number 30 on the UK Albums Chart, spending five weeks therein.

Track listing
"Chardonnay" (w, m: Roger Cook, Hugh Cornwell) – 3:04
"Caught in the Middle" (m: Cerys Matthews, Fred Ball, Hadrian Gerrards; w: Cerys Matthews) – 3:12
"Louisiana" (m: Cerys Matthews, Ketcham Secor; w: Cerys Matthews) – 2:21
"Weightless Again" (m: Brett Sparks; w: Rennie Sparks (The Handsome Family) – 3:02
"Only a Fool" (w, m: Cerys Matthews) – 2:47
"La Bague" (trad. arr: Cerys Matthews) – 0:40
"...Interlude..." (AKA "The Miller of Hooterville") (trad. arr: Bucky Baxter) – 0:46
"Ocean" (m: Cerys Matthews, Antony Genn, Martin Slattery; w: Cerys Matthews) – 2:05
"Arglwydd Dyma Fi" (trad. arr: Cerys Matthews) – 3:35
"If You're Lookin' For Love" (w, m: James Stallard, Cerys Matthews) – 2:56
"The Good in Goodbye" (w, m: Cerys Matthews) – 3:05
"Gypsy Song" (m: Cerys Matthews, Martin Slattery, Joe Strummer; w: Cerys Matthews) – 3:49
"All My Trials" (trad. arr: Cerys Matthews) – 3:11

Personnel
Bucky Baxter – producer, electric guitar, fiddle, vibraphone
Richard Bennett – guitar, bouzouki, banjo
Ken Coomer – drums
Eric Darken – marimba, vibraphone
Lloyd Green – pedal steel guitar
Jim Hoke – multi-instrumentalist
Glenn Worf – bass
Jonathan Yudkin – fiddle
Chad Brown – recording and mixing (at Three Trees Studios, White Creek, Tennessee)
Greg Fogie - recording engineer

Charts

References

External links
BBC Wales review 
BBC review

2003 debut albums
Cerys Matthews albums
Blanco y Negro Records albums